Zaza Kolelishvili (born January 11, 1957, in Telavi, Georgia) is a Georgian film and television actor, film director and artist. He is best known for The Wishing Tree 1977, Garigeba and Kukaracha.

Biography

He studied philology at the Tbilisi State University in 1997. Zaza studied acting at the Shota Rustaveli Theatre and Film University and the same University he studied directing in 1996. In 1981–1984, he worked at the Telavi State Theatre. In 1984–1991, he was working at the Rustaveli Theatre. Since 1985 Zaza is working at film studio Kartuli Pilmi.

Filmography
 As actor
 3+3  (2015)
 Paradox (2015)
 Garigeba 20 Tslis Shemdeg (2011)
 Quchis dgeebi (2010)
 Mediator (2008)
 Kukaracha (1982), Murtalo
 Isini (1992)
 Omi kvelastvis omia (1990)
 Mama, shvili da niavi (1988)
 Gamotskhadeba (1988)
 Khareba da Gogia (1987)
 Deduna (1987)
 Bravo, Alber Lolish (1987)
 Mamakatsebi (1985)
 Kvelaze stsrapebi msoplioshi (1985)
 Tu girtkamen – gaiqetsi (1984)
 Banditi aguris qarkhnidan (1983)
 Atovda zamtris bagebs (1983)
 The Wishing Tree (1977)
 Mimino (1977)
 Pyl pod solntsem (1977)
 As director 
 Garigeba 20 Tslis Shemdeg (2011)
 Omi da Qortsili (2010)
 Garigeba (1993)

 As production Design
 Ori Khevsuri (2006)
 Kutaiseli Babua  (2006)

References

External links

1957 births
Living people
Actors from Tbilisi
20th-century male actors from Georgia (country)
Male film actors from Georgia (country)
21st-century male actors from Georgia (country)
Film directors from Georgia (country)